T. Muthuraj  (born 29 July 1969 in Coimbatore, India) is an Indian film production designer. He is also the Production Designer of the Asia's Biggest film 2.0 which is directed by S. Shankar.

Early life and education 
He graduated from the Government College of Fine Arts, Chennai in 1991 and was the first assistant of Sabu Cyril.

Career 

His big break came in the 1997 Malayalam film Guru starring Mohanlal and Suresh Gopi, directed by Rajiv Anchal, for which he received the Kerala State Film Award for Best Art Director.  

Muthuraj has since worked in such path breaking hits as Arputha Theevu, Angadi theru, Pazhasi Raja, Irumbukottai Murattu Singham,Avan Ivan, I, Theri, Mersal, Velaikkaran, Bigil, 2.0  etc. 

He has contributed to the success of 60 plus feature films and 185 commercials. His work in Nanban (2012) directed by Shankar, had won huge appreciation from all quarters.

Filmography
 Jawan (2023)
 Indian 2 (2022)
 Ayalaan (2022)
 Bigil (2019)
 2.0 (2018)
 Velaikkaran (2017)
 Mersal(2017)
 Remo (2016)
 Theri (2016)
 Puli (2015)
 I (2015)
 Arima Nambi (2014)
 Oru Kanniyum Moonu Kalavaanikalum (2014)
 Raja Rani (2013)
 Nanban (2012)
 Avan Ivan (2011)
 Ponnar Shankar (2011)
 Angadi Theru (2010)
 Pazhassi Raja (2009)
 Kanna (2007)
 Ore Kadal (2007)
 Thirumagan (2007)
 Devadoothan  (2000)
 Naam
 Alice in Wonderland (2005)
 Varnajalam (2004)
 Punnagai Poove (2003)
 Solla Marandha Kadhai (2002)
 Millennium Stars (2000)
 Backwaters 
 Irandu Per (2003)
 Irandar Paavam 
 Priyamanavale (2000)
 Olympiyan Anthony Adam (1999)
 Chinthavishtayaya Shyamala (1998)
 Chitrashalabham (1998)
 Guru (1997)
 Yuvathurki (1996)
 Butterflies (1993)

Awards
 1997 – Kerala State Film Award for Best Art Director for Guru 
 1997 – Padmarajan Award
 1997 – Film Fraternity Award
 1998 – Film Critics Award
 2000 – MathruBhumi Award
 2000 – Film Critics Award
 2009 – Kerala State Film Award, Best Art Director
 2010 – MathruBhumi Award
 2010 – Variety Award
 2011 – Surya Award
 2012 – Edison Award
 2018 - Vijay Award for Best Art Direction - Velaikkaran

References

External links
 
 
 Muthuraj Art Director Interview in BehindWoods

Indian production designers
Living people
1969 births
Government College of Fine Arts, Chennai alumni
20th-century Indian designers
People from Coimbatore
Artists from Tamil Nadu
21st-century Indian designers
Kerala State Film Award winners